Ramón Ángel Bernuncio Almaraz (born 15 June 1965 in Buenos Aires), also known as Ángel Bernuncio, is a retired Argentine football midfielder who played for several clubs in Argentina and Mexico, including San Lorenzo, Lanús and Club Necaxa.  Bernuncio has managed several clubs after finishing his playing career, including Club Almagro, Barcelona S.C. and Tigres de la UANL. Actually is DT of Club Atlético All Boys.

External links
 Ramón Ángel Bernuncio at Fútbol XXI 
 Ángel Bernuncio at MedioTiempo  
 
 Ramon Angel Bernuncio at BDFA.com.ar 

Footballers from Buenos Aires
Argentine footballers
Association football midfielders
Argentine Primera División players
Liga MX players
San Lorenzo de Almagro footballers
Club Atlético Lanús footballers
Textil Mandiyú footballers
Club Atlético Platense footballers
Olimpo footballers
Barcelona S.C. footballers
Expatriate footballers in Ecuador
Argentine expatriate sportspeople in Ecuador
Club Necaxa footballers
Argentine expatriate footballers
Argentine football managers
Almagro managers
Barcelona S.C. managers
Tigres UANL managers
1965 births
Living people
Toros Neza footballers